Fred Mazelis was a third-party candidate for Vice President of the United States in the 1992 and 1996 presidential elections, representing the Socialist Equality Party.  He was the running mate of Helen Halyard and Jerome White respectively.

He had also been the party's candidate for U.S. Senator from Michigan in 1984.

In 1989, he ran for Mayor of New York.

Mazelis was a founding member of the Worker's League.

References

 Remarks of SEP Central Committee member Fred Mazelis to the May 17, 1998 Memorial Meeting in Minneapolis
 The Political Graveyard: Index to Politicians: Mayne to Mcallen

1992 United States vice-presidential candidates
1996 United States vice-presidential candidates
20th-century American politicians
Year of birth missing (living people)
Living people
Socialist Equality Party (United States) politicians